Nanjikottai is a panchayat town in Thanjavur district in the Indian state of Tamil Nadu. It is a part of the Thanjavur urban agglomeration.

Demographics
 India census, Nanjikottai had a population of 21,898. Males constitute 50% of the population and females 50%. Nanjikottai has an average literacy rate of 81%, higher than the national average of 59.5%: male literacy is 86%, and female literacy is 76%. In Nanjikottai, 9% of the population is under 6 years of age.

References

Cities and towns in Thanjavur district